This article lists the official squads for the 1991 Rugby World Cup that took place in England, Ireland, Scotland, Wales and France between 3 October and 2 November 1991. 

Players marked (c) were named as captain for their national squad. All details, such as number of international caps and player age, are current as of the opening day of the tournament on 3 October 1991.

Pool A

England

Head coach:  Geoff Cooke

Italy

Head coach:  Bertrand Fourcade

New Zealand

Head coaches:  John Hart and  Alex Wyllie

United States
Head coach:  Jim Perkins

Pool B

Ireland
Head coach:  Ciaran Fitzgerald

Japan
Head coach:  Hiroaki Shukuzawa

Scotland

Head coach:  Ian McGeechan

Zimbabwe
Trainer:  Iain Buchanan

Pool C

Argentina

Head coaches:  Luis Gradín /  Guillermo Lamarca

Australia

Head coach:  Bob Dwyer

Wales

Head coach:  Alan Davies

Western Samoa
Head coach:  Peter Schuster

Pool D

Canada

Head coach:  Ian Birtwell

Fiji
Head coaches:  Samisoni Viriviri and  George Simpkin

France

Head coach:  Daniel Dubroca

Romania

Head coach:  Peter Ianusevici

References

1991
Squads